Margaret Jean Holden (born November 3, 1964) is an American actress, stuntwoman and martial artist.

Early life and education
Margaret Jean Holden was born in Minneapolis, Minnesota on November 3, 1964, and attended Northern Arizona University and Arizona State University.

Career
Holden made her professional acting debut in 1987 in the feature film Bill & Ted's Excellent Adventure. She has guest-starred in JAG, Tales from the Crypt, Star Trek: Deep Space Nine, La Femme Nikita, The Fresh Prince of Bel-Air, Suddenly Susan, and The Steve Harvey Show.

She was featured in Steven Spielberg's The Lost World and Jan de Bont's Speed 2: Cruise Control, as well as other films including Philadelphia Experiment II as Jess after Courteney Cox bowed out of the role.

Holden is known for such television roles as  Arina in the adventure series BeastMaster. Holden played a role as an Earthforce navigator on board the Excalibur, in the Babylon 5 movie Babylon 5: A Call to Arms.

In the short-lived Babylon 5 spin-off television series Crusade she served as Chief Medical Officer Dr. Sarah Chambers on the same ship. She appeared as Sheeva in the film Mortal Kombat: Annihilation, and starred as Jesse Gavin, an undercover cop specializing in martial arts alongside Cory Everson in Ballistic (1995).

Personal life
Outside of the world of film and television, Holden has worked with combat veterans, and received an award from the Military Order of the Purple Heart in 1996 for "caring about combat-wounded veterans and veterans as a whole".

Filmography

Film

Television

References

External links
 
 
 

Living people
People from Eagle County, Colorado
Actresses from Colorado
American stunt performers
1964 births
African-American actresses
American television actresses
American film actresses
Actresses from Minneapolis
21st-century African-American people
21st-century African-American women
20th-century African-American people
20th-century African-American women